Popovka is a rural locality (a village) in Mishutinskoye Rural Settlement, Vozhegodsky District, Vologda Oblast, Russia. The population was 8 as of 2002.

Geography 
The distance to Vozhega is 64.5 km, to Mishutinskaya is 1.5 km. Agafonovskaya, Checheninskaya, Ozhiginskaya, Mishutinskaya are the nearest rural localities.

References 

Rural localities in Vozhegodsky District